Real Canoe Natación Club is the basketball team of this club based in Madrid, Spain. The section was founded in 1940.

The men's team played in the top division of Spanish basketball from 1957 to 1965, but nowadays plays in LEB Oro. The women's team was Liga Femenina champion three times, but now plays in Liga Femenina 2.

History

Men's team
Founded in 1940, after achieving several titles of second division and Regional Castilian championships, made its debut in the Liga Nacional in 1957, where it remained until 1965.

After reaching the second division in several stages during its whole history, it finally joined the Liga EBA since its foundation in 1994, where it played 20 of its 23 seasons before promoting and accepting to play in LEB Plata, third tier since 2000, league that refused to play after promoting in 2012.

On 5 June 2018, despite finishing the regular season in the ninth position, Real Canoe promoted to LEB Oro, thus coming back to a second tier league 22 years after.

Women's team
The women's team made its debut in the first division in 1980 after merging with Club de Vacaciones

Real Canoe achieved three consecutive leagues between 1983 and 1986 and a Copa de la Reina in 1996. The club resigned voluntarily to continue playing in the top tier in 2000 and since that resign, they only played two more seasons in Liga Femenina.

After resigning to play in Liga Femenina 2 in 2012, the club spent four years in the third tier before promoting again to the second division.

Players (men's)

Current roster

Depth chart

Season by season

Trophies and honors (women's)
Titles
 3 Leagues: 1984, 1985, 1986
 1 Cup: 1996

Notable players
To appear in this section a player must have either:
- Set a club record or won an individual award as a professional player.
- Played at least one official international match for his senior national team at any time.
 José María Gil
 Tyson Pérez
 Chris Gabriel

References

External links
 Official website
 EuroBasket.com profile

Basketball teams in the Community of Madrid
Women's basketball teams in Spain
LEB Oro teams
Former LEB Plata teams
Former Liga EBA teams
Basketball teams established in 1940
Sports teams in Madrid